Bruno Barros di Pietro or simply Bruno Barros (born June 15, 1982 in Teófilo Otoni), is a Brazilian left back. He currently plays for Anápolis on loan from Evangélica.

Contract
Villa Rio-RJ 1 January 2008 to 31 December 2011

External links
 galodigital
 Bruno Barros at Footballdatabase

1982 births
Living people
Brazilian footballers
América Futebol Clube (MG) players
Fortaleza Esporte Clube players
Ipatinga Futebol Clube players
Clube Atlético Mineiro players
Clube de Regatas Brasil players
Villa Rio Esporte Clube players
Villa Nova Atlético Clube players
Nacional Esporte Clube (MG) players
Tupi Football Club players
Association football defenders